Allison Anne Dahle (born March 25, 1964) is a Democratic member of the North Carolina House of Representatives. Dahle has represented the 11th district (including parts of Wake County) since 2019.

Personal life
Dahle was born at the old Rex Hospital in Raleigh, North Carolina. Her mother, Anne was a longtime educator at Meredith College, and her father was an agricultural economist at North Carolina State University. She attended Needham B. Broughton High School and graduated from the University of South Carolina with a degree in Theatre and Speech.

After her graduation, she worked as a stage manager on Broadway, and later for the Young Adult Institute in Brooklyn. Later, she worked for the Arc of North Carolina.

Dahle identifies as a lesbian. She is one of four openly LGBT officeholders currently serving in the North Carolina state legislature, alongside caucus colleagues Marcia Morey, Deb Butler and Cecil Brockman.

Political career
After defeating incumbent Duane Hall in the Democratic primary, Dahle was elected to the North Carolina House of Representatives on November 6, 2018. She secured sixty-nine percent of the vote while her closest rival Republican Brennan Brooks secured twenty-seven percent. Dahle was re-elected in 2020.

Electoral history

2020

2018

Committee assignments

2021-2022 session
Appropriations
Appropriations - General Government
Alcoholic Beverage Control
Election Law and Campaign Finance Reform (Vice Chair)
Ethics 
Local Government - Land Use, Planning and Development

2019-2020 session
Appropriations 
Appropriations - Agriculture and Natural and Economic Resources 
Alcoholic Beverage Control 
Election Law and Campaign Finance Reform
Homelessness, Foster Care, and Dependency

References

External links

Living people
1964 births
Needham B. Broughton High School alumni
University of South Carolina alumni
21st-century American politicians
21st-century American women politicians
Democratic Party members of the North Carolina House of Representatives
Women state legislators in North Carolina
LGBT state legislators in North Carolina
Lesbian politicians
21st-century LGBT people